Sextortion (a portmanteau of sex and extortion) employs non-physical forms of coercion to extort sexual favors from the victim.  Sextortion refers to the broad category of sexual exploitation in which abuse of power is the means of coercion, as well as to the category of sexual exploitation in which threatened release of sexual images or information is the means of coercion.

As used to describe an abuse of power, sextortion is a form of corruption in which people entrusted with power – such as government officials, judges, educators, law enforcement personnel, and employers – seek to extort sexual favors in exchange for something within their authority to grant or withhold.  Examples of such abuses of power include: government officials who request sexual favors to obtain licenses or permits, teachers who trade good grades for sex with students, and employers who make providing sexual favors a condition of obtaining a job.

Sextortion also refers to a form of blackmail in which sexual information or images are used to extort money or sexual favors from the victim. Social media and text messages are often the source of the sexual material and the threatened means of sharing it with others.  An example of this type of sextortion is where people are extorted with a nude image of themselves they shared on the Internet through sexting. They are later coerced into giving money, or performing sexual acts with the person doing the extorting or are coerced into posing or performing sexually on camera, thus producing hardcore pornography. This method of blackmail is also frequently used to out LGBT people who keep their true sexual orientation private.

A video highlighting the dangers of sextortion has been released by the National Crime Agency in the UK to educate people, especially given the fact that blackmail of a sexual nature may cause humiliation to a sufficient extent to cause the victim to take their own life, in addition to other efforts to educate the public on the risks of sextortion.

Webcam blackmail

Sextortion through the use of webcams is also a concern, especially for those who use webcams for flirting and cybersex. Often this involves a cybercriminal posing as someone else – such as an attractive person – initiating communication of a sexual nature with the victim (about 95% of victims are male). Often, the cybercriminal simply shows the victim a pre-recorded video of a performer from a cybersex webcam site which they are sufficiently familiar with, then messages the victim at points in the video where the performer appears to be typing on the keyboard, to give the illusion that the performer in the video is messaging them. The victim is then persuaded to undress in front of a webcam, and may also be persuaded to engage in sexual behaviour, such as masturbation. The video is recorded by the cybercriminal, who then reveals their true intent and demands money or other services (such as more explicit images of the victim, in cases of online predation), and threatening to publicly release the video to video services like YouTube and send it to family members and friends of the victim if they do not comply. Sometimes threats to make false allegations of paedophilia against the victim are made as well. This is known as webcam blackmail.  An increase in webcam blackmails have been reported, and it affects both young and old, male and female alike. Webcam blackmail is also connected with webcam trolling.

History
An early use of the term appears in print in 1950 in California.

Since early 2009, The Institute for Responsible Online and Cell-Phone Communication (iroc2.org) began warning the public about the trend of "Sextortion" via live events and websites including www.sextortion.org. This is a trend that grew based on the birth and growth of the trend known as "sexting" whereby compromising images and videos were being shared by individuals without a real understanding of the short and long term consequences of sharing "private" content on digital tools designed for sharing.

In 2009, the International Association of Women Judges (IAWJ), in partnership with the Association of Women Judges in Bosnia and Herzegovina, the Philippine Women Judges Association, and the Tanzania Women Judges Association, and with funding from the Government of the Netherlands, launched a three-year program on "Stopping the Abuse of Power through Sexual Exploitation: Naming, Shaming, and Ending Sextortion."   Presentations on sextortion were made to judges attending the 2010 and 2012 Biennial World Conferences of the IAWJ and to NGOs attending the 2011 and 2012 meetings of the UN Commission on the Status of Women.

There are also scientific studies describing the prevalence of sextortion in Europe, etc. in the Czech Republic (2017).

In China, there are cases of sextortion as part of predatory lending to students.

In 2022, the Canadian Centre for Child Protection noted a tripling of cases compared to previous years and a change away from female victims being sextorted for images towards young male victims being sextorted for money.

Incidents

Incidents of sextortion have been prosecuted under various criminal statutes, including as extortion, bribery, breach of trust, corruption, sexual coercion, sexual exploitation, sexual assault, child pornography, and computer hacking and wiretapping.

Anthony Stancl of Wisconsin, then 18, received 15 years in prison in February 2010 after he posed as a girl on Facebook to trick male high school classmates into sending him nude cell phone photos, which he then used to extort them for homosexual sex.
Jonathan Vance of Auburn, Alabama, was sentenced to 18 years in prison in April 2010 after sending threatening e-mails on Facebook and MySpace extorting nude photos from more than 50 women in three states.
Luis Mijangos was sentenced to six years in prison in September 2011 for hacking into dozens of computers, stealing personal information and demanding naked images from female victims in exchange for not releasing the stolen information. Forty-four of the victims were under age 18.
Steve Ellis, an immigration adjudicator in Toronto, was sentenced to 18 months in jail in July 2010 after telling a South Korean woman he would approve her refugee claim in exchange for sex. 
Michael Ngilangwa, a secondary school teacher in Tanzania, was sentenced to pay a fine or serve one year in prison in June 2011 after demanding sexual favors from his student in exchange for favorable exam results.
Christopher Patrick Gunn, 31, of Montgomery, Alabama was indicted for using fake Facebook profiles to extort nude photos and videos from underage girls in numerous states. He got 35 years in federal prison after being convicted.
 In May 2010, the police of the Basque Country in Spain arrested a 24-year-old man accused of blackmailing a woman he met on an online chatroom and threatening to distribute nude photographs of her from her webcam.
 13-year-old Amanda Todd was blackmailed by an online friend into exposing her breasts to him on her webcam. Over the next few years he sent the screenshots to people she personally knew, resulting in her developing mental health issues, suffering bullying (both online and in real life) and changing schools several times. She committed suicide by hanging on October 10, 2012, at the age of 15.
 A video of the Chinese Communist Party official Lei Zhengfu having sex with a woman was a part of a sextortion plot by a criminal gang.
In 2013, Daniel Perry committed suicide hours after falling victim to webcam blackmail.
Anton Martynenko was sentenced to 38 years in a federal prison, after victimizing over 155 teenage boys by making around 50 fake accounts on Facebook, often those of young women, to convince the victims to send him nude photos. The accounts were also used to spread the explicit photos and videos of the victims to their high school classmates, with one boy's photos being sold on the dark web. In addition, three boys were blackmailed into meeting up with Martynenko and performing sex acts with him; two of the victims later committed suicide. Martynenko is considered the largest producer of child pornography in Minnesota history.

References

External links

 Institute for Responsible Online and Cell-Phone Communication. www.sextortion.org
 Frederick S. Lane, Cybertraps for the Young, (Chicago: NTI Upstream, 2011)
 Gross, Doug. "Police: Naked scammers seduce, blackmail men on Web." CNN. February 18, 2013.
 "Cyber Alerts for Parents & Kids Tip #2: Beware of ‘Sextortion’." (Archive) Federal Bureau of Investigation. February 10, 2012.
 "A Case of ‘Sextortion’ Cons Like ‘Bieber Ruse’ Targeted Minor Girls." (Archive) Federal Bureau of Investigation. February 5, 2013.
 Morris, Kevin. "Man strips on camera for "girlfriend," gets blackmailed." The Daily Dot. May 6, 2013.
 "Kids blackmailed into online Sex." CNN. September 20, 2013.
 Vives, Ruben. "Glendale man sentenced to 5 years in 'sextortion' case." Los Angeles Times. December 9, 2013.
 "Sextortion scam email campaign has netted $143k in Bitcoin." Thexyz. November 13, 2018 .

Cybercrime
Extortion
Internet culture
Sex crimes
Sex and the law
Pornography
Privacy controversies and disputes
Revenge
Sexual abuse
Sexual misconduct
Sexting